Michael Edward Jones (born 25 February 1994) is an Australian motorcycle racer. He currently competes in the Australian Superbike Championship for Yamaha Factory Racing R1. He was Australian Superbike Champion in 2015 and 2019 aboard the  Ducati 1299 Panigale R Final Edition.

Career statistics

Superbike World Championship

Races by year

Grand Prix motorcycle racing

By season

Races by year

References

External links

Living people
Motorcycle racers from Brisbane
1994 births
Superbike World Championship riders
Avintia Racing MotoGP riders
Ángel Nieto Team MotoGP riders
MotoGP World Championship riders